Kristen Stewart is an American actress and filmmaker who has received numerous nominations and has won multiple awards, including a BAFTA Award, a César Award and a Gotham Award. Stewart rose to fame with the lead role as Bella Swan in The Twilight Saga, for her work in the franchise, she received seven MTV Movie Awards, three People's Choice Awards, ten Teen Choice Awards and the BAFTA Rising Star Award.

In 2014, Stewart received critical acclaim for her performance in Olivier Assayas' drama film Clouds of Sils Maria, for which she won the César Award for Best Supporting Actress, alongside various critics association awards. In 2021, she received critical acclaim for her portrayal of Diana, Princess of Wales in Pablo Larraín's biopic Spencer, for which she received nominations for the Golden Globe Award, Critics Choice Award, and Academy Award for Best Actress, amongst numerous others.

Major associations

Academy Awards 
Also known as the Oscars, the Academy Awards are awards for artistic and technical merit in the film industry. They are regarded by many as the most prestigious and significant awards in the entertainment industry worldwide and are given annually by the Academy of Motion Picture Arts and Sciences (AMPAS). Stewart has been nominated once.

AACTA Awards 
The Australian Academy of Cinema and Television Arts Awards, known as the AACTA Awards, are presented annually by the Australian Academy of Cinema and Television Arts to recognise excellence in the film and television industry both locally and internationally. Stewart has been nominated once.

British Academy Film Awards 
The British Academy Film Awards are presented in an annual award show hosted by the British Academy of Film and Television Arts (BAFTA).

César Awards 
The César Awards are the national film awards of France. It is delivered in the Nuit des César ceremony and was first awarded in 1976. The nominations are selected by the members of twelve categories of filmmaking professionals and supported by the French Ministry of Culture.

Golden Globe Awards 
The Golden Globe Awards are accolades bestowed by the members of the Hollywood Foreign Press Association beginning in January 1944, recognizing excellence in both American and international film and television.

Screen Actors Guild Awards 
The Screen Actors Guild Awards are organized by the Screen Actors Guild-American Federation of Television and Radio Artists. First awarded in 1995, the awards aim to recognize excellent achievements in film and television.

Industry awards

Chlotrudis Awards 
The Chlotrudis Society for Independent Film is a non-profit organization that honors outstanding achievement in independent and foreign films.

Critics' Choice Movie Awards 
The Critics' Choice Movie Awards (formerly known as the Broadcast Film Critics Association Awards) honor the best in cinematic achievement, presented annually by the Critics Choice Association.

Gotham Independent Film Awards 
Presented by the Independent Filmmaker Project, the Gotham Independent Film Awards award the best in independent film.

Satellite Awards 
The Satellite Awards are given by the International Press Academy that are commonly noted in entertainment industry journals and blogs.

Young Artist Awards 
The Young Artist Award (originally known as the Youth In Film Award) is an accolade bestowed by the Young Artist Association, a non-profit organization founded in 1978 to honor excellence of youth performers, and to provide scholarships for young artists who may be physically and/or financially challenged.

Film festival awards

Critics awards

Audience awards

MTV Movie Awards 
The MTV Movie Awards is a film awards show presented annually on MTV. The nominees are decided by producers and executives at MTV. Winners are decided online by the general public.

Nickelodeon Kids' Choice Awards 
The Nickelodeon Kids' Choice Awards is an American awards show presented annually by Nickelodeon.

People's Choice Awards 
The People's Choice Awards is an American awards show, recognizing the people and the work of popular culture, voted on by the general public. The show has been held annually since 1975.

Teen Choice Awards 
The Teen Choice Awards is an annual awards show that airs on the Fox television network. The awards honor the year's biggest achievements in music, movies, sports, television, fashion, and more, voted by teen viewers (ages 13 to 19).

Other awards

Scream Awards 
The Scream Awards is an annual awards award show dedicated to the horror, sci-fi, and fantasy genres of feature films.

Notes

References

External links
 

Stewart, Kristen